Maurits Bourgon Crucq (born 10 February 1968 in Voorburg, South Holland) is a former field hockey defender from the Netherlands, who played 132 international matches for the Dutch national team, in which he scored eleven goals. A player from HC Klein Zwitserland, Crucq twice won an Olympic medal: bronze in 1988 and gold in 1996.

References
 Dutch Hockey Federation

External links
 

1968 births
Living people
Dutch male field hockey players
Field hockey players at the 1988 Summer Olympics
Field hockey players at the 1992 Summer Olympics
Field hockey players at the 1996 Summer Olympics
Olympic field hockey players of the Netherlands
Olympic gold medalists for the Netherlands
Olympic bronze medalists for the Netherlands
Olympic medalists in field hockey
Medalists at the 1988 Summer Olympics
Medalists at the 1996 Summer Olympics
Sportspeople from Voorburg
HC Klein Zwitserland players
1990 Men's Hockey World Cup players
20th-century Dutch people
21st-century Dutch people